Basu Poribar is a 1952 Bengali film directed by Nirmal Dey under the banner of M.P Productions. Uttam Kumar, Sabitri Chatterjee, Supriya Devi, Bhanu Banerjee and Jiben Bose play lead roles. The film was released on 11 April 1952. It was the debut film of legendary Bengali actress Supriya Devi. It was the first successful film starring Uttam Kumar. After seven back to back flop films he was called 'flop master general', and he considered to leave the film industry. The success of this film saved his career. The film was remade in Hindi as Hum Hindustani in 1960.

Plot
Satyen (Jiben Bose) is a very sincere, energetic, honest, hardworking executive in a private law firm. A cloud of anxiety has covered their family. Only a court order can rescue them from the trouble. But, eventually they lose the case. It is a great blow for the whole Basu family. Sukhen (Uttam Kumar is the elder brother of Satyen and he tries to provide some support to his family. But the entire financial condition of the Basu family is actually getting poorer day by day. In the meantime Achala a modern young lady and the lover of Satyen wants to marry him. Unfortunately Satyen is trapped and convicted for a charge. He does not want to inform his family members. Satyen thinks that his older brother, Sukhen is the culprit, but Sukhen earned money in a legal and honest way; Sukhen is actually a writer. Achintya, a relative of the law firm owner, is the main villain. At last the Basu family stands united and their reputation is restored.

Cast
 Uttam Kumar as Sukhen
 Sabitri Chatterjee as Achala
 Jiben Bose as Satyen
 Pahari Sanyal as Sukhen and Satyen's father
 Supriya Devi as Sukhen and Satyen's young sister(debut film)
 Bhanu Bannerjee
 Manjula Bannerjee
 Naresh Bose
 Rekha Chatterjee
 Dhiraj Das
 Gopal Dey

Soundtrack

Remake
The film is remade in Hindi in 1960 as Hum Hindustani. Which is shooted in grava color. The film starring Sunil Dutt, Joy Mukherjee, Asha Parekh, Gajanan Jagirdar and Helen.

References

External links
 

1952 films
Bengali-language Indian films
Bengali films remade in other languages
1950s Bengali-language films
Indian drama films
1952 drama films
Indian black-and-white films
Films directed by Nirmal Dey